Megaselia nigra is a species of scuttle fly (also called hump-backed flies) in the family Phoridae. Megaselia species are common pests of mushroom cultivation, attracted by the aroma of developing fungal mycelium. The larvae feed on the developing mycelium of the mushroom, ultimately damaging both the mycelium and gill tissues.

Megaselia nigra can be infected by the symbiotic bacteria Spiroplasma, which may protect its fly host from attack by parasites.

See also 

 Megaselia halterata
 Megaselia scalaris

References 

Phoridae
Insects described in 1830